Hoani Te Puna i Rangiriri Taipua (1839  or 1840 – 29/30 September 1896) was a 19th-century Māori member of the New Zealand House of Representatives.

He was born at Rangiuru Pa, Ōtaki to his parents Te Puna I Rangiriri and Te Ria Haukoraki. Both his parents were also a part of the Ngāti Raukawa migration to Ōtaki from Maungatautari. He is of Ngati Pare descent, and is also kin to Ngati Huia and Ngāti Toa. He was born of a very high chiefly status.

He represented the Western Maori electorate from the 1886 by-election after the death of Te Puke Te Ao to 1893 when he retired.

He was married to Hiria Te Mahauariki a.k.a. Amokura, whom he had numerous children with. Today his descendants still live in the Ōtaki area.

References

1839 births
New Zealand MPs for Māori electorates
Members of the New Zealand House of Representatives
Year of death unknown
People from Ōtaki, New Zealand
1896 deaths
Unsuccessful candidates in the 1879 New Zealand general election
19th-century New Zealand politicians